Rikke Olsen Siegemund (born 19 April 1975) is a retired badminton player from Denmark. She won the mixed doubles title at the World Junior Championships in 1992 and the girls' doubles title at the European Junior Championships in 1993.

Born in Søndre Roskilde, Olsen came from the badminton family, and started playing at the age of six. She trained in Kastrup-Magleby BK and played for the team for eight seasons, won fourteen National titles, seven World Championships bronze medals, three times runner-up in All England Open, and reached in to the bronze medal match at the Olympic Games in 1996, 2000 and 2004. During her career, she was ranked as world No. 1 in the mixed doubles and No. 2 in the women's doubles. After retiring from the tournament, she became the national junior coach. She is currently performance manager at Badminton New Zealand.

Her sister Lotte Olsen also played badminton at the 1996 Summer Olympics. She is married to German badminton player Björn Siegemund and settled in Solrød Strand. The pair has two kids.

Career 
Olsen competed in badminton at the 2004 Summer Olympics in women's doubles with partner Ann-Lou Jørgensen.  They had a bye in the first round and defeated Nicole Grether and Juliane Schenk of Germany in the second.  In the quarterfinals, Olsen and Jørgensen lost to Huang Sui and Gao Ling of China 15-6, 15-7.

She also competed in mixed doubles with partner Jonas Rasmussen.  They had a bye in the first round and defeated Daniel Shirley and Sara Petersen of New Zealand in the second.  In the quarterfinals, Olsen and Rasmussen beat Kim Dong-moon and Ra Kyung-min of Korea 17-14, 15-8, to advance to the semifinals.  There, they lost to Nathan Robertson and Gail Emms of Great Britain 15-6, 15-12.  In the bronze medal match, they were defeated by fellow Danish pair Jens Eriksen and Mette Schjoldager 15-5, 15-5, to finish in  fourth place.

In February 2018, Olsen Siegemund left her job as Danish Under 19s national coach to start a four year contract as combined sports manager and national coach for New Zealand.

Achievements

World Championships 
Women's doubles

Mixed doubles

World Cup 
Women's doubles

Mixed doubles

European Championships 
Women's doubles

Mixed doubles

World Junior Championships 
Mixed doubles

European Junior Championships 
Girls' singles

Girls' doubles

IBF World Grand Prix
The World Badminton Grand Prix sanctioned by International Badminton Federation (IBF) since 1983.

Women's doubles

Mixed doubles

IBF International
Women's doubles

Mixed doubles

References

External links 
 
 BWF player profile

1975 births
Living people
People from Roskilde
People from Solrød Municipality
Danish female badminton players
Badminton players at the 1996 Summer Olympics
Badminton players at the 2000 Summer Olympics
Badminton players at the 2004 Summer Olympics
Olympic badminton players of Denmark
World No. 1 badminton players
Badminton coaches
Sportspeople from Region Zealand